Hans-Joachim Gelberg (27 August 1930 – 17 May 2020) was a German writer and publisher of children's books, who received several awards.

Biography 
Gelberg was born in Dortmund and later lived in Weinheim, Baden Württemberg.

Gelberg founded in 1971 the children’s book series Beltz & Gelberg as part of the publisher . The initial eight books grew to 1000 titles in 25 years. He published a magazine for youth literature, Der bunte Hund, around three times per year. He began a yearbook for children's literature in 1971, which appeared until 1999. He lectured at the University of Frankfurt. In 2011, he published an anthology of poetry for children, entitled Wo kommen die Worte her? (Where do the words come from?). It contains poems by more than 100 authors expressly written for the book, and also older poems by Christian Morgenstern and Joachim Ringelnatz, among others.

Gelberg died on 17 May 2020 in a hospice in Weinheim, aged 89.

Awards 
 1972: Deutscher Jugendliteraturpreis for Geh und spiel mit dem Riesen
 2001: Bologna Ragazzi Award for Großer Ozean: Gedichte für alle
 2004: 
 2014: The primary school in Lützelsachsen, a district of Weinheim, was named after him.

Books 
 Geh und spiel mit dem Riesen. Beltz & Gelberg, Weinheim 1971, .
 Update on Rumpelstiltskin and other Fairy Tales by 43 Authors. Illustrations by Willi Glasauer, Beltz & Gelberg, Weinheim 1976, .
 Der bunte Hund. Beltz & Gelberg, Weinheim 1982, .
 Kinderland – Zauberland. Maier, Ravensburg 1986, .
 Aller Dings. Werkstattbuch zum Programm B & G. Beltz & Gelberg, Weinheim 1996, .
 Grosser Ozean: Gedichte für alle. Beltz & Gelberg, Weinheim 2006, .
 Eines Tages: Geschichten von überallher. Beltz & Gelberg, Weinheim 2008, 
 Märchen aus Aller Welt. Illustrations of  Nikolaus Heidelbach, Beltz & Gelberg, Weinheim 2010

References

External links 

1930 births
2020 deaths
Writers from Dortmund
German publishers (people)
German children's writers

20th-century publishers (people)
21st-century publishers (people)
20th-century German writers
21st-century German writers
Businesspeople from Dortmund